Ananta Deb Adhikari is an Indian politician from West Bengal, India who currently serves as Chairman of newly established Maynaguri Municipality. He is a member of the West Bengal Legislative Assembly representing the Maynaguri (Vidhan Sabha constituency) three times. He was the leader of first Maynaguri Municipaliti election in 2021 . He is now the first chairman of Maynaguri municipality.

Political career
Adhikari is a member of the All India Trinamool Congress.

Adhikari represents the Maynaguri (Vidhan Sabha constituency). In 2014 Adhikari won the Maynaguri (Vidhan Sabha constituency) on an All India Trinamool Congress ticket. In 2011 Adhikari won the Maynaguri seat on a Revolutionary Socialist Party (RSP) ticket.

References

External links 
Member's List West Bengal Legislative Assembly

 

Living people
Trinamool Congress politicians from West Bengal
Year of birth missing (living people)
West Bengal MLAs 2016–2021
West Bengal MLAs 2011–2016